This is a list of European cuisines. A cuisine is a characteristic style of cooking practices and traditions, often associated with a specific culture. European cuisine (also called "Western cuisine") refers collectively to the cuisines of Europe and other Western countries. European cuisine includes cuisines of Europe, including (depending on the definition) that of Russia, as well as non-indigenous cuisines of North America, Australasia, Oceania, and Latin America, which derive substantial influence from European settlers in those regions. The term is used by East Asians to contrast with Asian styles of cooking. This is analogous to Westerners referring collectively to the cuisines of Asian countries as Asian cuisine. When used by Westerners, the term may refer more specifically to cuisine in Europe; in this context, a synonym is Continental cuisine, especially in British English.

The cuisines of Western countries are diverse by themselves, although there are common characteristics that distinguishes Western cooking from cuisines of Asian countries and others. Compared with traditional cooking of Asian countries, for example, meat is more prominent and substantial in serving-size. Wheat-flour bread has long been the most common sources of starch in this cuisine, along with pasta, dumplings and pastries, although the potato has become a major starch plant in the diet of Europeans and their diaspora since the European colonization of the Americas.

Central European cuisine 

  Austrian cuisine is a style of cuisine native to Austria and composed of influences from throughout the former Austro-Hungarian Empire. Regional influences from Italy, Hungary, Germany and the Balkans have had an effect on Austrian cooking, and in turn this fusion of styles was influential throughout the Empire.
Austrian wine
Viennese cuisine
  Czech cuisine has both influenced and been influenced by the cuisines of surrounding countries. Many of the fine cakes and pastries that are popular in Central Europe originated in the Czech lands. Czech cuisine is marked by a strong emphasis on meat dishes. Pork is quite common, and beef and chicken are also popular.
 Czech wine
 German cuisine
 German wine
  Baden cuisine
  Bavarian cuisine
  Brandenburg cuisine
  Franconian cuisine
  Hamburg cuisine
  Hessian cuisine
  Lower Saxon cuisine
  Mecklenburg cuisine
  Palatine cuisine
  Pomeranian cuisine
  Rhenish-Hessian cuisine
  Saxon cuisine
  Schleswig-Holstein cuisine
  Silesian cuisine
  Swabian cuisine
  Hungarian cuisine is the cuisine characteristic of the nation of Hungary and its primary ethnic group, the Magyars. Traditional Hungarian dishes are primarily based on meats, seasonal vegetables, fruits, fresh bread, cheeses and honey. Recipes are based on centuries-old traditions of spicing and preparation methods.
 Hungarian wine
 Goulash
 Liechtensteiner cuisine
 Liechtenstein wine
  Polish cuisine is the cuisine characteristic of the nation of Poland and its primary ethnic group, the Poles. Traditional Polish dishes are based on meats, vegetables, fruits, breads, cheeses, sausages, milk, etc. The most typical ingredients used in Polish cuisine are sauerkraut, paprika, beetroot, cucumbers (gherkins), sour cream, kohlrabi, mushrooms, sausages and smoked sausage. A meal owes it taste to the herbs and spices used; such as marjoram, dill, caraway seeds, parsley, or pepper. The most popular desserts are cakes and pastries.
 Polish wine
 Pierogi
  Silesian cuisine
  Slovak cuisine varies slightly, though sometimes dramatically, from region to region, and was influenced by the traditional cuisine of its neighbors. The origins of traditional Slovak cuisine can be traced to times when the majority of the population lived in villages, in self-sustenance, with very limited food imports and exports and with no modern means of food preservation or processing. This gave rise to a cuisine heavily dependent on a number of staple foods that could stand the hot summers and cold winters, including wheat, potatoes, milk and milk products, pork meat, sauerkraut and onion. To a lesser degree beef, poultry, lamb and goat, eggs, a few other local vegetables, fruit and wild mushrooms were traditionally eaten.
 Slovak wine
  Slovenian cuisine there are many distinct cuisines in a country, whose main distinguishing feature is a great variety and diversity of land formation, climate, wind movements, humidity, terrain and history. Slovenia is a borderland country, surrounded by Italy, Austria, Hungary, and Croatia, with established and distinct national cuisines. There is a wide variety of meats in different parts of Slovenia. Dandelion) is Slovenian wild lettuce, which has been gathered in the fields for centuries.
 Slovenian wine
  Swiss cuisine
 Swiss wine

Eastern European cuisine 

 Cuisines of Eastern Europe
  Belarusian cuisine shares the same roots with cuisines of other Eastern and Northern European countries, basing predominantly on meat and various vegetables typical for the region.

 Bulgarian cuisine is a representative of the cuisine of Southeastern Europe. Essentially South Slavic, it shares characteristics with other Balkans cuisines. Owing to the relatively warm climate and diverse geography affording excellent growth conditions for a variety of vegetables, herbs and fruits, Bulgarian cuisine is diverse.
Bulgarian wine
  Kazakh cuisine
  Moldovan cuisine – Moldova's fertile soil (chernozem) produces plentiful grapes, fruits, vegetables, cereals, meat and milk products, all of which have found their uses in the national cuisine. The fertile black soil combined with the use of traditional agricultural methods permits growing a wide range of ecologically clean foods in Moldova.
 Moldovan wine
  Romanian cuisine is a diverse blend of different dishes from several traditions with which it has come into contact, but it also maintains its own character. It has been greatly influenced by Ottoman cuisine.
 Romanian wine
  Russian cuisine is diverse, as Russia is the largest country in the world. Russia's great expansions of territory, influence, and interest during the 16th–18th centuries brought more refined foods and culinary techniques, as well as one of the most refined food countries in the world. It was during this period that smoked meats and fish, pastry cooking, salads and green vegetables, chocolate, ice cream, wine, and liquor were imported from abroad. At least for the urban aristocracy and provincial gentry, this opened the doors for the creative integration of these new foodstuffs with traditional Russian dishes. The result is extremely varied in technique, seasoning, and combination. Traditional and common Russian foods include:
 Beer
 Blini, a pastry rolled with a variety of ingredients
 Borshch, a traditional Russian beet soup
 Caviar
 Crêpe
 Ice cream
 Pelmeni, pastry dumplings filled with minced meat
 Pirozhki, pastries filled with potato, cabbage, meat or cheese
 Shashlyk, Russian kebab
 Sour cream
 Russian vodka
  Tatar cuisine
  Mordovian cuisine
 Russian wine

  Ukrainian cuisine has significant diversity, historical traditions and is influenced by Russian, Turkish and Polish cuisines. Common foods used include meats, vegetables, mushrooms, fruits, berries and herbs. In Ukraine, bread is a staple food, there are many different types of bread, and Ukraine is sometimes referred to as the "breadbasket of Europe." Pickled vegetables are utilized, particularly when fresh vegetables aren't in season. There are about 30 varieties of Ukrainian Borsch soup, a common dish that often includes meat.
 Crimean Tatar cuisine is primarily the cuisine of the Crimean Tatars, who live on the Crimean Peninsula in Ukraine. The traditional cuisine of the Crimean Tatars derives basically from the same roots as the cuisine of the Volga Tatars, although unlike the Volga Tatars they do not eat horse meat and do not drink mare's milk (kymyz). However, the Crimean Tatars adopted many Uzbek dishes during their exile in Central Asia since 1944, and these dishes have been absorbed into Crimean Tatar national cuisine after their return to Crimea.
  Ukrainian wine
 Caucasian cuisine – cuisines of The Caucasus
  Armenian cuisine includes the foods and cooking techniques of the Armenian people, the Armenian diaspora and traditional Armenian foods and dishes. The cuisine reflects the history and geography where Armenians have lived as well as incorporating outside influences. The cuisine also reflects the traditional crops and animals grown and raised in areas populated by Armenians.
 Armenian wine
  Azerbaijani cuisine is the cuisine of Azerbaijan. Azerbaijani cuisine throughout the centuries has been influenced by the foods of different cultures due to political and economic processes in Azerbaijan. Out of 11 climate zones known in the world, the Azerbaijani climate has nine. This contributes to the fertility of the land, which in its turn results in the richness of the country's cuisine.
 Azerbaijani wine
  Georgian cuisine refers to the cooking styles and dishes with origins in the nation of Georgia and prepared by Georgian people around the world. The Georgian cuisine is specific to the country, but also contains some influences from the Middle Eastern and European culinary traditions.
 Georgian wine

Northern European cuisine 

 Baltic cuisines
  Estonian cuisine
  Latvian cuisine
  Lithuanian cuisine
 Livonian cuisine
 Cuisines of the Islands of the North Atlantic (IONA)
  British cuisine is the specific set of cooking traditions and practices associated with the United Kingdom. British cuisine has been described as "unfussy dishes made with quality local ingredients, matched with simple sauces to accentuate flavour, rather than disguise it." However, British cuisine has absorbed the cultural influence of those that have settled in Britain, producing hybrid dishes, such as the Anglo-Indian chicken tikka masala."
  Channel Islands cuisine
  English cuisine
 Cornish cuisine
 Devonian cuisine
 Dorset cuisine
  Northern Irish cuisine
  Scottish cuisine is the specific set of cooking traditions and practices associated with Scotland. It has distinctive attributes and recipes of its own, but shares much with wider European cuisine as a result of foreign and local influences both ancient and modern. Scotland's natural larder of game, dairy, fish, fruit, and vegetables is the integral factor in traditional Scottish cooking. Scotland, with its temperate climate and abundance of indigenous game species, has provided a cornucopia of food for its inhabitants for millennia. The wealth of seafood available on and off the coasts provided the earliest settlers with their sustenance. Agriculture was introduced, with primitive oats quickly becoming the staple.
  Welsh cuisine
 Cuisine of Carmarthenshire
 Cuisine of Ceredigion
 Cuisine of Gower
 Cuisine of Monmouthshire
 Cuisine of Pembrokeshire
 Wine from the United Kingdom
 Regional foods
 British Sunday roast
 Fish and chips
  Irish cuisine
 Nordic cuisines
  Danish cuisine
 Danish wine
  Faroese cuisine
  New Nordic cuisine
  Finnish cuisine
  Icelandic cuisine
  Norwegian cuisine
  Sami cuisine
  Swedish cuisine
 Swedish wine

Southern European cuisine 

 Balkan cuisine
  Albanian cuisine is uniquely influenced by Turkish, Greek, and Italian cuisines. Every region in Albania has its own unique dishes. Albanian cuisine is characterized by the use of various Mediterranean herbs such as oregano, black pepper, mint, basilico, rosemary and more in cooking meat and fish.
Albanian wine
  Aromanian cuisine
  Bosnian cuisine
  Croatian cuisine
 Croatian wine

  Greek cuisine
 Greek wine
 Macedonian cuisine (Greek)
 Regional foods
Taramosalata, a Greek meze made with salted and cured fish roe.
  Kosovan cuisine
  Macedonian cuisine
 Macedonian wine
  Montenegrin cuisine
 Montenegrin wine
  Serbian cuisine
 Serbian wine

 Cuisines of the Iberian Peninsula
  Gibraltarian cuisine
  Portuguese cuisine
 Portuguese wine
 Port wine
  Spanish cuisine has a variety of dishes including thousands of recipes and flavors arising from Spain's extensive history with many cultural influences, and variations in geography and climate. It is heavily influenced by seafood available from the waters that surround the country, and reflects the country's deep maritime roots. Spanish wine is a significant part of Spanish cuisine. Regional Spanish cuisines include:
  Andalusian cuisine
  Asturian cuisine
  Aragonese cuisine
  Balearic cuisine
  Basque cuisine
  Canarian cuisine
  Cantabrian cuisine
  Castilian-Leonese cuisine
  Castilian-Manchego cuisine
  Cuisine of the Community of Madrid
  Catalan cuisine (includes Andorran cuisine)
  Extremaduran cuisine
  Galician cuisine
  Leonese cuisine
  Valencian cuisine
  Cuisine of Minorca

 Cuisines of the Italian Peninsula
  Italian cuisine – presents popular dishes like pizza, pasta, lasagne, Mozzarella and other well-known food. Italian cuisine has been influenced by Ancient Greek, Ancient Roman, Etruscan cuisines and dates back to 4th century BCE. It maintains strong regional diversity and it uses a vast variety of ingredients, mostly because of the political divisions in Italian history and different climate and resources in the country. Most of the dishes are simple to prepare and not expensive, which is one of the reason it is very popular around the world.
 Italian wine
 Regional Cuisines – in Italian cuisine, each area has its own specialties, primarily at the regional level, but also at provincial levels. The cuisine has an abundance of differences in taste, and is known to be one of the most popular in the world, with influences abroad. The differences can derive from a bordering country (such as France or Austria), whether a region is close to the sea or the mountains, and economics. Italian cuisine is also seasonal, often incorporating fresh produce. Italian regional cuisines include:
 Abruzzese and Molisan
 Arbëreshë
 Basilicatan or Lucanian
 Calabrian
 Emilia-Romagnan
 Friuli-Venezia Giulian
 Lazian or Roman
 Ligurian
 Lombard
Mantuan
 Marche
 Neapolitan cuisine, Campanian
 Piedmontese
 Pugliese
 Sardinian
 Sicilian cuisine
 Trentino-Alto Adigan/South Tyrolean
 Tuscan cuisine
 Umbrian
 Valle d'Aostan
 Venetian cuisine
  Maltese cuisine
 Maltese wine
  Sammarinese cuisine

 Mediterranean cuisine
 Mediterranean diet
  Cypriot cuisine is the cuisine of Cyprus and can be described as a blend of Greek and Turkish cuisines. Greek Cypriot cuisine is another regional Greek cuisine along with Cretan, Ionian, or Attic.
 Cypriot wine

  Turkish cuisine is largely the heritage of Ottoman cuisine, which can be described as a fusion and refinement of Central Asian, Middle Eastern, Eastern European, Armenian and Balkan cuisines.
 Turkish wine
 Northern Cypriot cuisine

Western European cuisine 

  Belgian cuisine
 Belgian wine
  Dutch cuisine
 Dutch wine
  French cuisine
 French regional cuisine is characterized by its extreme diversity and style. Traditionally, each region of France has its own distinctive cuisine. French cuisine styles include nouvelle cuisine, haute cuisine and cuisine classique. In November 2010 the French gastronomy was added by UNESCO to its lists of the world's "intangible cultural heritage".
 Corsican cuisine
 Lyonnaise cuisine
 French wine
  Luxembourgian cuisine
 Luxembourg wine
  Monégasque cuisine
  Occitan cuisine

Regional cuisines 
 Regional Dutch cuisines can be distinguished by three geographic regions in the Netherlands, northeastern, western and southern cuisine.
 German regional cuisine can be divided into Bavarian cuisine (Southern Germany), Lower Saxon cuisine (Northern Germany), Thuringian (Central Germany) and Saxony-Anhalt (Central Germany).
 The Alpine cuisine is characterised throughout the entire Alpine region by the isolated rural life on the alpine huts and in the mountain villages.

Historical cuisines 
 Regional cuisines of medieval Europe were the results of differences in climate, seasonal food variations, political administration and religious customs that varied across the continent.

See also 
 List of cuisines

References 

Cuisine by continent
Cuisine
Food- and drink-related lists